Muchalls railway station served the village of Muchalls, Kincardineshire, Scotland from 1849 to 1950 on the Aberdeen Railway.

History 
The station was opened on 1 February 1850 by the Aberdeen Railway. There was a goods yard at the east side of the line.

The station was host to a LMS caravan from 1936 to 1939.

The station closed to both passengers and goods traffic on 4 December 1950. Freight service was transferred to Newtonhill railway station.

Nothing remains of the station, however its location can be best estimated by the location of the Muchalls Peace Sign, which is located nearby. The peace sign is  visible from Marine Terrace, Muchalls just south of the junction with Walker Drive.

References

External links 

Former Caledonian Railway stations
Railway stations in Great Britain opened in 1849
Railway stations in Great Britain closed in 1950
1849 establishments in Scotland
1950 disestablishments in Scotland